Joshua Minkler is an American attorney who is a partner at Barnes & Thornburg. He served as the United States Attorney for the United States District Court for the Southern District of Indiana from October 2017 through November 2020. He served as interim U.S. Attorney for the same district from June 2015 until September 2017, when he was confirmed for the position by the United States Senate. Minkler graduated from Wabash College in 1985 and Indiana University Maurer School of Law in 1988. Prior to assuming his role as a U.S. Attorney, Minkler served for 21 years as an Assistant United States Attorney in the Southern District of Indiana, where he held the positions of First Assistant United States Attorney and Chief of the Drug and Violent Crime Unit. Before he joined the U.S. Attorney's office, Minkler served for five years as an assistant prosecuting attorney in the office of the Kent County, Michigan, prosecuting attorney, where he prosecuted violent crimes.

In 2017, after the U.S. Attorney in Kentucky recused himself, Minkler took over the prosecution of Renee Boucher in the assault case where Boucher was alleged to have attacked Kentucky Senator Rand Paul.

In November 2020, Minkler announced his resignation as United States Attorney effective November 21, 2020. He subsequently joined a private law firm, becoming a partner at Barnes & Thornburg.

References

External links
 Biography at Barnes and Thornburg LLP

Living people
1963 births
21st-century American lawyers
Assistant United States Attorneys
Indiana lawyers
Indiana University Maurer School of Law alumni
United States Attorneys for the Southern District of Indiana
Wabash College alumni